Peillac (Gallo: Peilla) is a commune in the east of Morbihan department of Brittany in north-western France.

Geography
The canal de Nantes à Brest forms all of the commune's northern border; the river Arz forms all of its southern border.

Demographics
Inhabitants of Peillac are called in French Peillacois.

Map

See also
Communes of the Morbihan department

References

External links
 Mayors of Morbihan Association 

Communes of Morbihan